Elachista trifasciata is a moth of the family Elachistidae. It was described by Edith Wollaston in 1879 and is found on Saint Helena island in the South Atlantic Ocean.

References

trifasciata
Moths described in 1879
Moths of Africa